A hybrid sport is one which combines two or more (often similar) sports in order to create a new sport, or to allow meaningful competition between players of those sports.

List 
B 
 Bossaball – a hybrid sport combining elements of volleyball, association football, gymnastics, and Capoeira, played on a field with three bases, there is a trampoline at the third base along with a net. Allowing players to bounce high to spike or touch the ball and touch it with any part of the body, especially arms and hands
 Boston game - a hybrid between association and rugby football and considered a milestone in the development of American football.

C
 Chess boxing – a hybrid sport which combines the sport of boxing with games of chess in alternating rounds. Chess boxing fights have been organized since early 2003. The sport was started when Dutch artist Iepe Rubingh, inspired by fictional descriptions of the sport in the writing of Enki Bilal, organized matches. The sport has become increasingly popular since then. To succeed players must be both skilled chess players and skilled boxers.
 Circle rules football – a hybrid of association football, volleyball, basketball, wrestling, and rugby, with a goal located on the center of circle field.
 Composite rules shinty-hurling – The Irish sports of hurling or camogie combined with the Scottish sport of shinty.
 Composite rules softball-baseball - a hybrid bat-and-ball sports which combines the elements of baseball and softball, played on the large identical baseball diamond with the larger ball, ten rather than nine innings, and both underarm and overarm pitchings.
 Cycle ball - a hybrid sport combined bicycle and Futsal
D
 Disc golf – a hybrid Frisbee with elements of golf. 
 Double disc court - a combined of Frisbee and Volleyball

F
 Foobaskill – an other hybrid of association football and basketball
 Football tennis – a hybrid of association football and tennis
 Footgolf – a hybrid of association football and golf
 Footvolley – a hybrid of Beach football and Beach volleyball

H
 Hakoball – a hybrid of handball and korfball
 Hurlacrosse – a hybrid of hurling and lacrosse
 Hybrid martial arts – a full contact individual combat sports which allowed to use the wide range of all aspects and techniques of several different martial arts and combat sports.
 Hybrid rugby – a hybrid of rugby union and rugby league

I
 International rules football – a combination of  Gaelic football and Australian rules football. The International Rules Series, an annual series of two games between representative teams from Ireland and Australia, attracted sell-out crowds during its 2006 edition.

K
 Kronum – a field sport mixing elements of association football, handball and basketball

N
 Nashball – a field sport mixing elements of association football, fistball, basketball, ultimate frisbee, and volleyball using horizontal end zone goals and strict no open-hand contact and strike.

P
 Polocrosse - A hybrid of polo and lacrosse, played on horseback.

R
 Rap-7 ball – an other hybrid of baseball and cricket which played under the baseball rules
 Roll ball – a unique combination of roller skating, basketball and handball which played under the handball rules

S
 Samoa Rules – A hybrid of rugby union and Australian rules football
 Segway Rugpolocrosse - A field sport which combines elements of Segway polo, rugby, and lacrosse, played on the segway rather than horse, allowing players to run with it either in hands or in the netted racket of lacrosse stick, and contact, impede, and tackle each other with the player's body, lacrosse stick, and segway.
 Slamball - a full-contact team hybrid sports which will combine elements of basketball, American football, ice hockey, acrobatics, and video games, played on the basketball court, surrounded by hockey-style plexiglass walls, with two sets of four trampolines at the front of net and boards around the edges of this court.
Spikeball - a hybrid sport of Volleyball and trampoline
Sepak takraw - a hybrid of association football and volleyball; an indoor version of footvolley

T
 360ball - a combination of Racket sport and trampoline 
 Tennis polo – a hybrid of tennis, Handball and polo
 Teqball – a hybrid of table tennis and Soccer

U
 Ultimate (sport) - a hybrid of Frisbee and American football or rugby football

V
 Vigoro – a hybrid of cricket and tennis

W
 Waterpolo – a hybrid of swimming and handball
 Water basketball a hybrid of Water polo and Basketball

Inactive sports
 Austus – a combination of American football and Australian rules football played during World War II. However, this hybrid sport has not been recorded as having been played since the war.
 Dartchery - the hybrid sports combining both Darts and Archery, using bows and arrows typically used for archery but the target is the dart board. It was contested at the Paralympics since the first one until the 1980, but it has possible comeback in the future.
 Iomain – a variation of shinty-hurling, using a compromise stick, piloted once in 2013
 Universal football – a combination of rugby league and Australian rules football trialed briefly in the early 20th century
 Volata

Gallery

References

Sports by type